Seelig is a surname and given name. It may refer to:

People with the surname 

 Adam Seelig (born 1975), Canadian-American poet and playwright
Andreas Seelig (born 1970), German discus thrower
 Carl Seelig (1894-1962), German-Swiss writer
 Eric Seelig (1909-1984), German-American boxer
 Georg Seelig (living), Swiss bioengineer
 Heinz Seelig (1909-1992), German-Israeli interior architect
 Jen Seelig (born 1969/1970), American politician from Utah
 Joachim Seelig (born 1942), German chemist
 Michael Seelig (born 1938), Israeli-Canadian architect
 Paul Seelig (1900-1931), Swiss actor
 Tim Seelig (living), American conductor
 Tina Seelig (born 1957), American educator
 Anna Seelig-Löffler (living), Swiss chemist

People with the given name 

 Seelig Wise (1913-2004), American politician from Mississippi

Geographical entities 

 Seelig Peak, mountain in Antarctica
 Seelig–Byler House, historical building in Oregon, USA

Other uses 

 Baldwin v. G.A.F. Seelig, Inc., United States Supreme Court case

Disambiguation pages